Vice is a 2018 American biographical political satire black comedy-drama film directed, written, and co-produced by Adam McKay and starring Christian Bale as former U.S. Vice President Dick Cheney, with Amy Adams, Steve Carell, Sam Rockwell, Justin Kirk, Tyler Perry, Alison Pill, Lily Rabe, and Jesse Plemons in supporting roles. The film follows Cheney on his path to becoming the most powerful vice president in American history. It is the second theatrical film to depict the presidency of George W. Bush, following Oliver Stone's W. (2008).

Vice was released in the United States on December 25, 2018, by Annapurna Pictures, and grossed $76 million worldwide. While the performances were universally acclaimed, the film polarized critics; some considered it to be one of the best films of the year while others thought it to be one of the worst, with McKay's screenplay and direction receiving both "scathing critiques and celebratory praise". The film received numerous accolades, with eight nominations at the Oscars, including for Best Picture, winning Best Make-Up and Hairstyling. It also received six nominations each from the Golden Globes (including for Best Motion Picture – Musical or Comedy) and the BAFTAs. For their performances, Bale, Adams, and Rockwell were nominated at all three shows, with Bale winning the Golden Globe Award for Best Actor – Motion Picture Musical or Comedy.

Plot
Vice is narrated by Kurt, a fictitious veteran of the Afghan and Iraqi wars.

In 1963, Dick Cheney works as a lineman in Wyoming after his alcoholism led him to drop out of Yale University. After Cheney is stopped by a traffic cop for driving while intoxicated, his wife Lynne Cheney tells him to clean up his life or she'll leave him.

In 1969, Cheney finds work as a White House intern during the Nixon Administration. Working under Nixon's economic adviser, Donald Rumsfeld, Cheney becomes a savvy political operative as he juggles commitments to his wife and their daughters, Liz and Mary. Cheney overhears Henry Kissinger discussing the secret bombing of Cambodia with President Richard Nixon, revealing the true power of the executive branch to Cheney. Rumsfeld's abrasive attitude leads to him and Cheney being distanced from Nixon, which works in both men's favor; after Nixon's resignation, Cheney rises to the position of White House Chief of Staff for President Gerald Ford while Rumsfeld becomes Secretary of Defense. The media later dubs the sudden shake-up in the cabinet as the Halloween Massacre. During his tenure, a young Antonin Scalia introduces Cheney to the unitary executive theory.

After Ford loses the election, Cheney runs to be representative for Wyoming. After giving an awkward and uncharismatic campaign speech, Cheney suffers his first heart attack. While he recovers, Lynne campaigns on her husband's behalf, helping him to win a seat in the U.S. House of Representatives. During the Reagan Administration, Cheney supports a raft of conservative, pro-business policies favoring the fossil fuel industries, as well as the abolition of the FCC fairness doctrine, which led to the rise of Fox News, conservative talk radio, and the increasing level of party polarization in the United States. Cheney next serves as Secretary of Defense under President George H. W. Bush during the Gulf War. Outside of politics, Cheney and Lynne come to terms with their younger daughter, Mary, coming out as a lesbian. Though Cheney develops ambitions to run for president, he decides to retire from public life to spare Mary from media scrutiny.

Cheney becomes the CEO of Halliburton while his wife breeds golden retrievers and writes books. A false epilogue claims that Cheney lived the rest of his life healthy and happy in the private sector and credits begin rolling, only for them to end abruptly as the film continues.

Cheney is invited to become the running mate of George W. Bush in the 2000 United States presidential election. Under the impression that Bush is more interested in pleasing his father than attaining power for himself, Cheney agrees on the condition that Bush delegates executive responsibilities to him and avoids getting him involved in the Republican Party's stance against gay rights. As vice president, Cheney works with Secretary of Defense Rumsfeld, legal counsel David Addington, Mary Matalin, and Chief of Staff Scooter Libby to exercise control of key foreign policy and defense decisions.

In the aftermath of the September 11, 2001 terrorist attacks, Cheney and Rumsfeld maneuvered to initiate and preside over the U.S. invasions of Afghanistan and Iraq. Various other events from his vice presidency are depicted, including his endorsement of the unitary executive theory, the Plame affair, the accidental shooting of Harry Whittington, and tensions between the Cheney sisters over same-sex marriage. Cheney's actions are shown to lead to hundreds of thousands of deaths and the rise of the Islamic State of Iraq, resulting in him receiving record-low approval ratings by the end of the Bush administration.

While narrating Cheney's tearful deathbed goodbye to his family after another hospitalization, Kurt dies in a road traffic incident while jogging. In March 2012, his healthy heart is transplanted into Cheney. A few months later, Cheney accepts his daughter Liz's opposition to same-sex marriage, which she expresses when she runs for a Senate seat in Wyoming; this upsets Mary. Liz later wins election to her father's former Congressional position. At the end of the film, an irate Cheney breaks the fourth wall and delivers a monologue to the audience, asking them "which terror attack would you allow to go unchecked so you don't look like a mean and nasty fella", admits he's not perfect, states that he has no regrets about anything he has done in his career and concludes by thanking the audience for giving him the powers to transform the vice-presidency.

In a mid-credit scene, a focus group depicted earlier in the movie gets into another argument about the efficacy of the film and the Presidency of Donald Trump, whereas some members of the group are uninterested and would rather do something other than politics.

Cast

Main characters

Supporting characters

Production
On November 22, 2016, it was announced that Paramount Pictures had come on board to handle the rights to a drama about Dick Cheney; the screenplay was to be written by Adam McKay, who would also direct. The film was produced by Plan B producers Brad Pitt, Dede Gardner and Jeremy Kleiner, along with McKay and his Gary Sanchez partners Will Ferrell and Kevin Messick. Bale signed on to play Cheney in April 2017, and gained 40 pounds (18 kg) for the role.

On August 22, Bill Pullman was cast as Nelson Rockefeller (though did not appear in the finished film), and a title, Backseat, was announced. It was later changed to Vice. On August 31, Sam Rockwell was cast as George W. Bush. In September 2017, Adam Bartley joined the cast.

Principal production commenced in late September 2017. Tyler Perry and Lily Rabe joined the film in October as Colin Powell and Liz Cheney, respectively.

Music

Release
The film premiered at the Samuel Goldwyn Theater in Beverly Hills on December 11, 2018.

Vice was released in both Canada and the United States on December 25, 2018 alongside Holmes & Watson. It was previously scheduled for release on December 14, 2018. The film opened in the U.K. on January 25, 2019, with most of Europe and Hong Kong following with February 2019 release dates.

Vice was released on Blu-ray Disc and DVD by 20th Century Fox Home Entertainment on April 2, 2019.

Reception

Box office
Vice grossed $47.8 million in the United States and Canada, and $28.2 million in other territories, for a total worldwide gross of $76.1 million, against a production budget of $60 million.

In the United States and Canada, the film was released alongside Holmes & Watson on Christmas Day and was projected to gross around $13 million from 2,378 theaters over its first six days. It made $4.8 million on its first day and $2.9 million on its second. The film went on to have a first weekend gross of $7.8 million, for a six-day total of $17.7 million. According to The Hollywood Reporter, the film performed its "best on both coasts, versus America's heartland, although some theaters in markets including Dallas, Houston and Phoenix turned in respectable business". It then made $5.8 million in its second weekend and $3.3 million in its third.

Critical response
The website's critical consensus reads: "Vice takes scattershot aim at its targets, but writer-director Adam McKay hits some satisfying bullseyes—and Christian Bale's transformation is a sight to behold." On Metacritic, the film has a weighted average score 61 out of 100, based on 54 critics, indicating "generally favorable reviews". Audiences polled by CinemaScore gave the film an average grade of "C+" on an A+ to F scale, while those at PostTrak gave it an overall positive score of 72% and a 49% "definite recommend". The critical response to Vice made it one of the worst-reviewed films to ever be nominated for Best Picture at the Academy Awards.

Todd McCarthy of The Hollywood Reporter, who named the film his favorite of 2018, wrote: "Across the board in Vice, everyone has risen to the occasion of their individual challenges, none of them easy, to collectively pull off a political satire that both provokes great laughs and hits home with some tragic truths". Eric Kohn of IndieWire gave the film a "B−" and called it "messy but ambitious", writing: "Vice, in its rambunctious and unfocused manner, takes some ludicrous risks to make cogent points about Cheney's malicious intent—and how he put his plans into action". By contrast, Peter Bradshaw of The Guardian awarded the film 4/5 stars, and wrote that Bale "captur[es] the former vice-president's bland magnificence in Adam McKay's entertainingly nihilist biopic".

Rolling Stone film critic Peter Travers praised the film, giving it a 4/5 rating and writing: "Adam McKay's flamethrowing take on Dick Cheney, played by a shockingly brilliant Christian Bale, polarizes by being ferociously funny one minute, bleakly sorrowful the next, and ready to indict the past in the name of our scarily uncertain future."

Stephanie Zacharek of Time gave the film a negative review, describing Vice as an "exhausting film that turns Dick Cheney into a cartoon villain". Ikon London Magazine, while praising the make-up artistry of Greg Cannom, noted that "the story reminds of a witch hunt".
 
Ann Hornaday of The Washington Post praised Bale's performance as Cheney but criticized the story pacing, awarding the film 2/5 stars. Hornaday had issues with the film's structure, writing that the film is "a mess, zigging here and zagging there, never knowing quite when to end, and when it finally does, leaving few penetrating or genuinely illuminating ideas to ponder". Similarly, Scott Mendelson of Forbes praised Bale's and Amy Adams's performances, but criticized the film as a "cinematic mediocrity".

Historical inaccuracies 

Numerous scenes from the film were identified as being historically inaccurate, heavily dramatized, or presented without necessary context. Politifact stated that in certain scenes, "the line between historic facts and poetic interpretation gets fuzzy".

In an early scene where Rumsfeld (played by Steve Carell) is introduced, it was stated that he was an elite Navy jet pilot. In reality, Rumsfeld never flew jet-engine aircraft during active-duty service within the United States Navy; he only flew propeller-engine aircraft such as the Grumman S-2F Tracker and North American T-6 Texan.

During the early scene when Cheney first arrives for his congressional internship program in 1969, it is depicted that Cheney still has not yet decided whom he will work for and decides to work with Illinois's 13th district Congressman, Donald Rumsfeld following Cheney listening to and admiring Rumsfeld's speech. In real-life, Dick Cheney, who had been affiliated with the Republican Party and conservatism prior to his government service work, was actually introduced to Donald Rumsfeld by Rumsfeld's colleague in the House of Representatives,  Congressman William A. Steiger from the 6th district of Wisconsin, to work under Rumsfeld when he was appointed by President Richard Nixon as Director of the Office of Economic Opportunity and needed more staff to work with. During Rumsfeld's tenure as Director of the Office of Economic Opportunity, Rumsfeld also brings along his old protégé from Rumsfeld's time at Princeton University, Frank Carlucci to work along with Dick Cheney to assist Rumsfeld with tasks as Director of the Office of Economic Opportunity. Carlucci later succeeded Rumsfeld as Director of the Office of Economic Opportunity when Rumsfeld was appointed as Counselor to the President by President Nixon and coincidentally both Rumsfeld, Cheney and Carlucci would later serve as United States Secretary of Defense.

An important scene in the film that depicts Dick Cheney conversing with Antonin Scalia in the mid-1970s about expanding the power of the executive branch is totally fictional. However, Cheney campaigned for increased presidential authority. In the scene, the "theory of the unitary executive" is mentioned although the phrase did not become used by legal scholars until the late 1980s. Politifact says that the film also "butchers" the meaning of the unitary executive when in reality, the theory says the president has ultimate control over the executive branch. However, the film represents the theory as advocating for the president to have unlimited powers.

The film implies that Lynne Cheney's father murdered her mother; however, there is no evidence provided for this assertion. Officially, Lynne Cheney's mother Edna drowned on the evening of May 24, 1973 at the age of 54. She was walking her dogs near Yesness Pond and slipped and fell in. She did not know how to swim and her body was found after her husband reported her missing. Both the sheriff and coroner stated that there was no evidence to indicate foul play and her drowning was ruled accidental. Edna had been taking blood pressure medicine that often made her dizzy; her daughter Lynne Cheney theorized that she lost her balance when chasing after her dogs. Lynne Cheney never implied that her father could have killed her mother. Instead, she stated that her father was so devastated after the death of his wife that he drank himself to death two years later. The implication made by the film was described by the "HistoryVSHollywood" website as a conspiracy theory.

Responses from Cheney family
Dick Cheney's daughter and Congresswoman Liz Cheney criticized Christian Bale for his portrayal of her father in Vice, remarking during a Fox & Friends interview that "he finally had the chance to play a real superhero, and he clearly screwed it up". Liz also responded negatively to Bale's acceptance speech for winning the Best Actor in a Comedy or Musical Golden Globe for his portrayal of Cheney, in which the actor thanked Satan for inspiring him to play the role of Cheney.

Accolades 

Vice has received multiple awards and nominations, and was nominated for six Golden Globe Awards at the 76th annual ceremony, the most nominations of any film, with Bale winning for Best Actor – Motion Picture Musical or Comedy. The film was subsequently nominated for eight awards at the 91st Academy Awards (winning Best Make-Up and Hairstyling), nine awards at the 24th Critics' Choice Awards (winning Best Actor and Best Actor in a Comedy for Bale), six awards at the 72nd British Academy Film Awards (winning Best Editing), and 4 nominations at the 8th AACTA International Awards.

References

External links

 
 
 
 
 

2018 films
2010s biographical films
2018 black comedy films
2018 comedy-drama films
2018 LGBT-related films
2010s satirical films
American biographical films
American black comedy films
American comedy-drama films
American political drama films
American LGBT-related films
American nonlinear narrative films
American satirical films
Annapurna Pictures films
BAFTA winners (films)
Comedy-drama films based on actual events
Cultural depictions of George H. W. Bush
Cultural depictions of George W. Bush
Cultural depictions of Gerald Ford
Cultural depictions of Henry Kissinger
Cultural depictions of Richard Nixon
Cultural depictions of Osama bin Laden
Cultural depictions of Dick Cheney
Films about George W. Bush
Films about presidents of the United States
Films based on the September 11 attacks
Films directed by Adam McKay
Films featuring a Best Musical or Comedy Actor Golden Globe winning performance
Films produced by Will Ferrell
Films produced by Adam McKay
Films produced by Brad Pitt
Films scored by Nicholas Britell
Films set in 1963
Films set in 1968
Films set in the 1960s
Films set in the 1970s
Films set in the 1980s
Films set in the 1990s
Films set in the 2000s
Films set in the 2010s
Films set in Maryland
Films set in the White House
Films set in Virginia
Films set in Washington, D.C.
Films set in Wyoming
Films that won the Academy Award for Best Makeup
Gary Sanchez Productions films
Plan B Entertainment films
2010s English-language films
2010s American films